A primary measure of a nation's power projection is its over-the-beach capability. This consists of the number of soldiers, tanks, vehicles, and helicopters that a nation can stage over an adversary's defended coast in a time of war. Generally, these elements only count if they can be projected across hundreds of kilometers of open ocean. Over-the-beach capability determines a nation's power projection together with forward airpower (strength of aircraft carriers and/or overseas airbases), alliances, and nuclear options.

See also
 Amphibious warfare
 Blue-water navy
 Power projection

References

Further reading
 Alexander, Joseph H., and Merrill L. Bartlett. Sea Soldiers in the Cold War: Amphibious Warfare, 1945-1991 (1994) 
 Bartlett, Merrill L. Assault from the Sea: Essays on the History of Amphibious Warfare (1993) 
 Ireland,  Bernard. The World Encyclopedia of Amphibious Warfare Vessels: An illustrated history of modern amphibious warfare (2011)

External links
 US Army Field Manual 100-10 Chapter 1: Power Projection
 US Army Field Manual 100-7 Chapter 6: Force Projection

Military logistics
Military strategy